Dawadmi or Ad Dawadimi is a town in Riyadh Province, Saudi Arabia. Google Maps spells the name as Al Duwadimi. As of the 2004 census it had a population of 53,071 people. The town is mostly inhabited by the tribe of Banu 'Utaybah. 

It is located on top of Najd hill, the central area of Saudi Arabia.

In April 2003, the new airport in the city was inaugurated by the Crown Prince of Saudi Arabia. King Abdulaziz palace is a landmark of the city and there is an ongoing rehabilitation project to protect it.

Missile Production near al Duwadimi

According to research at the Middlebury Institute  of International Studies, in California, a facility near al Duwadimi is operating a "burn pit" to dispose of solid-propellent leftover from production of ballistic missiles. On Dec 23, 2021, in an article by Zachary Cohen, CNN published satellite images of the site.

Climate

See also 

 List of cities and towns in Saudi Arabia
Regions of Saudi Arabia
Dawadmi Domestic Airport

References 

Populated places in Riyadh Province